Sundar K. Vijayan is an Indian film and television series director, who has directed Tamil language content. The son of director K. Vijayan, Sundar began his career in films in the late 1980s, before prioritising television commitments in the 2000s.

Career

In the 1980s, Vijayan made a series of films including Revathy (1986) and Velicham (1987), and finished off the Bhagyaraj-starrer En Rathathin Rathame (!989), started by his father. He was closely associated with actress Ranjini in the late 1980s.

Vijayan also played a pivotal role in introducing actor Samuthirakani into Tamil cinema, by hiring him on as a copywriter during the 1990s. A number of directors, including Venu Arvind and Premsai, apprenticed under him during their period of training.

In the 2000s, Vijayan collaborated with a number of lead actresses including Raadhika, Khushboo, Amala, Devayani and Meena for primetime television serials. By 2005, he had directed over 1500 episodes. He was awarded a Kalaimamani award in 2009 for his work on Tamil television.

Filmography

Films

Television

References

External links

Living people
Tamil film directors
Film directors from Tamil Nadu
20th-century Indian film directors
Tamil screenwriters
1960 births
Tamil television directors